Selandria is a genus of sawflies belonging to the family Tenthredinidae.

The species of this genus are found in Europe and Northern America.

Species:
 Selandria doryca Smith, 1860
  Selandria magica Zhang, 1989

References

Tenthredinidae
Sawfly genera